Rádio Bandeirantes (RB) is a Brazilian news radio network, based in São Paulo, property of Grupo Bandeirantes de Comunicação. It was created in 1937 as an all-news service (i.e. broadcasting news 24 hours a day).

RB operates on the frequencies of 840 kHz (AM) and 90.9 MHz (FM)

Crew
Its anchor journalists are José Paulo de Andrade, Salomão Esper, Milton Parron, Haisem Abaki, Zancopé Simões, Milton Neves (Sports), Sérgio Patrick (Sports) and Ricardo Capriotti (Sports).

External links
Official website

Brazilian radio networks
Grupo Bandeirantes de Comunicação
Radio stations established in 1937
1937 establishments in Brazil